John E. Ward was a Major League Baseball player.

He played in one game, recording one hit in four at bats.

External links

Major League Baseball outfielders
Baseball players from Washington, D.C.
Washington Nationals (UA) players
19th-century baseball players